Love Child is the second album released by the New York-based Latin freestyle trio Sweet Sensation. The album was released on April 15, 1990 by Atco Records and Atlantic Records. It is also the follow-up to the group's platinum-selling 1988 debut album, Take It While It's Hot. Like its predecessor, Love Child had an up-tempo feel, but also included lavish R&B-styled ballads.

The album's title song is a cover version of a #2 R&B/#1 Pop smash by the Supremes. Sweet Sensation's version went to #15 on Billboard's dance chart and #13 on Billboard's pop chart. However, it was the album's second single that gave the group its biggest hit ever, "If Wishes Came True," a power ballad featuring vocals by Betty Lebron. The song spent one week at #1 on Billboard's pop chart in September 1990, while going top-ten on Billboard's Adult Contemporary charts. The album also spawned two more hit singles: "Each and Every Time" (#59) and "One Good Man". The album itself peaked at #78 on the Billboard 200 albums chart and was certified platinum in the spring of 1991 by the RIAA.

Track listing

Personnel

Sweet Sensation
Betty LeBron: lead and backing vocals
Audrey Wheeler: background vocals

Musicians
Percussion: Graham Hawthorne, Bashiri Johnson, Emedin Rivera, Steve Thornton
Loops: Charlie Dee Diaz
Programming: Charlie Dee Diaz, Phillip Ashley, Ken Cedar, Gary Henry, Richard Joseph, Dr. Bob Khozouri, Mac Quayle, Romeo J.D., Peter "Ski" Schwartz
Keyboards: Dr. Bob Khozouri, Jim Klein, Andy Marvel
Guitars: Russ De Salvo, Werner F., John Hart, Jim Klein
Scratching: King Shameek
Trombone: Barry Rogers

Production
Produced by Ted Currier and Steve Peck
Additional production by Charlie Dee Diaz
Executive producer: Cherrie Shepard
Arranged by Phillip Ashley, Ken Cedar, Andy Marvel, Steve Peck, Mac Quayle, Arnie Roman
Vocal arrangements: Tony Terry and Audrey Wheeler
Engineers: Paul Berry, Richard Joseph, Steve Peck
Mixing: Ted Currier, Rod Hui, Jim Lyons, Steve Peck, Charlie Dee Diaz
Mastering: Ted Jensen

References 

1990 albums
Atco Records albums
Atlantic Records albums
Sweet Sensation albums